Sandbach railway station serves the town of Sandbach in Cheshire, England. The station is  miles (8 km) north-east of Crewe on the Crewe to Manchester Line.

Although the station is named Sandbach, it is sited in the local residential suburb of Elworth on the A533 road, which links the town with Middlewich and Northwich.

History
Sandbach was a double junction on the LNWR and later London Midland and Scottish Railway line from Crewe to Manchester. For many years, Sandbach was a junction for the single line branch to Middlewich and Northwich railway station; opening on 1 July 1868, it closed for passenger service in January 1960, but it still carries freight on a daily basis. Even earlier, the North Staffordshire Railway branch from Kidsgrove to Sandbach via Lawton Junction ceased passenger service in July 1930 and closed to freight traffic in 1964.

Services

On Mondays to Saturdays during the daytime, there are two trains per hour to Crewe southbound, with one per hour to Manchester Piccadilly and one per hour to Liverpool Lime Street northbound. The Piccadilly service operates via Stockport (calling at all stations en route) and the Liverpool service travels via Styal and St Helens Junction (calling at most stations en route). There is an hourly service during the evening in each direction via Stockport.

On Sundays, there is a hourly service in each direction, northbound via Stockport.

Sandbach has three platforms:

Platform 1 for southbound trains to Crewe.
Platform 2 for northbound services to Manchester Piccadilly and Liverpool Lime Street.
Platform 3 is bidirectional, which used on weekday mornings and as required.

Facilities

The station has a ticket office on platform 1; this is staffed part-time on Mondays to Saturdays only (Monday - Friday 06:30 - 13:00, Saturday 07:20 - 13:50).  Outside these times, tickets must be purchased prior to travel or on board the train.  A waiting room on platforms 2 and 3 is open at the times the station is staffed, whilst there are shelters on both sides.  Train running details are offered via timetable posters, digital CIS displays and by telephone.  No step-free access is available, as the footbridge to platforms 2 and 3 does not have ramps and the Crewe platform has steps from the car park.

References

Further reading

External links

 Crewe-Manchester Community Rail Partnership

Sandbach
Railway stations in Cheshire
DfT Category E stations
Former London and North Western Railway stations
Railway stations in Great Britain opened in 1842
Northern franchise railway stations